In music, Op. 390 stands for Opus number 390. Compositions that are assigned this number include:

 Milhaud – Symphony No. 12
 Strauss – Nordseebilder